The Restored Republic was the era of Mexican history between 1867 and 1876, starting with the liberal triumph over the Second French Intervention in Mexico and the fall of the Second Mexican Empire and ending with Porfirio Diaz's ascension to the presidency. It was followed by the three-decade dictatorship known as the Porfiriato.

The liberal coalition that had weathered the French intervention disintegrated after 1867, to the point of resulting in armed conflict. Three men dominated politics in this era, two from Oaxaca, Benito Juárez and Porfirio Díaz, and Sebastián Lerdo de Tejada. Lerdo's biographer summed up the three ambitious men: "Juárez believed he was indispensable; while Lerdo regarded himself as infallible and Díaz as inevitable." Liberals split between moderates and radicals.  There was also a generational split between older, civilian liberals like Juárez and Lerdo, and younger, military leaders, such as Díaz.

Juárez was seen by his supporters as the embodiment of the struggle for national liberation, but his continuation in office after 1865, when his term as president ended, led to accusations of autocracy, and opened the door to liberal rivals challenging his hold on power. With the exit of the French in 1867, Juárez built a political machine to keep himself and his supporters in power. It was a politically unstable time, with multiple rebellions in 1867, 1868, 1869, 1870, and 1871 Despite that optimistic vision, political opposition to Juárez and Lerdo grew in the period and gravitated to support of Porfirio Díaz. Díaz found success in the 1876 civil war against Lerdo and began the next political era, the Porfiriato.

Fall of the Empire
After the fall of Queretaro, Emperor Maximilian and his two leading generals Miguel Miramón and Tomás Mejía were tried and then executed on June 19, 1867. The capital fell shortly afterwards before the end of June, and President Juarez entered the city on the morning of July 15, accompanied by his ministers José María Iglesias and Sebastian Lerdo de Tejada who would both go on to play notable roles during the era of the Restored Republic.

The Juarez government pursued a policy of seizing the properties of those who had collaborated with the Empire reducing entire families to poverty. This resulted in great uproar, and a condemnation of such a measure as unconstitutional. Juarez would rescind the measure and replace it with a fine.

There was public opposition to Juarez’ ongoing emergency powers, which he had been granted during the war, and martial law was still retained throughout the country on the pretext of protecting freedom of elections. On August 17, a long delayed law was published decreeing new elections to be held for the presidency and for the congress. The people were also asked to express their wish on certain proposed amendments to the constitution, such as granting the president a veto that would require a two thirds congressional majority to override  The proposed amendments inspired opposition to the point where Juarez had to publish explanations.

An opposition party, calling itself constitutionalist and supporting the candidacy of Porfirio Diaz now emerged, but when elections were held in October, Juarez obtained a majority of the votes. On December 19 congress certified the election and he assumed office on the 25th.

Third Juarez presidency

National disorders

Political disturbances broke out as soon as Juarez assumed his new term. The Caste War continued to flare up in Yucatan, and the Revolución de los Ríos had broken out among the Yaqui and the Mayo in Sonora. The latter would end in the Bacum Massacre in which Mexican troops killed over a hundred Yaqui men, women, and children. The government further defeated insurrections in Guerrero, Puebla, Veracruz, Mexico State, Queretaro, Jalisco, and Sinaloa.

Mexico experienced a series of natural disasters during this time as well, Matamoros, Bagdad, and Brazos in Tamaulipas being almost destroyed by earthquakes, hurricanes, and freshets during October and November 1867. Tuxtepec, Oaxaca suffered a devastating earthquake in May 1870. In 1869, a drought caused a substantial decline in the crop of maize.

Early in 1868, violence was running rampant throughout the nation. In most of the states, robbery, kidnapping, and murder were of daily occurrence.  José María Patoni a former liberal commander was kidnapped and murdered in August, 1868, by the commander of a local garrison in Durango, which caused a national scandal.

The year 1869 opened with a pronunciamiento in Mérida, Yucatan in January and February which was summarily suppressed with a number of the insurgents put to death by Colonel Ceballos.

Miguel Negrete led another revolt at Puebla on February 3, but was defeated by the end of the month. Insurrections had occurred in all of the states, but by June 1869, the nation had been mostly pacified. Negrete himself was captured and sentenced to death, but due to public outcry over his previous services to the nation including serving at the Battle of Puebla, Negrete was eventually pardoned.

A more serious insurrection occurred at the end of the year at San Luis Potosi, headed by Francisco Aguirre, Martinez, and Larranaga. It was joined by the governor of Zacatecas, Trinidad García de la Cadena, who placed himself at the head of the entire movement. Juarez assumed emergency powers, and defeated the insurrection in four months. The rebels were defeated on February 22, 1870, by General Rocha at a place known ad Lo de Ovejo, after which they were dispersed.

On October 13, 1870, congress passed a general amnesty law absolving anyone accused of treason, with the exception of certain high officials and deserters who had worked with the Second Mexican Empire.

Elections of 1871
President Juarez had provoked opposition by choosing to retain the same ministers he had held during his term of emergency powers during the French Intervention. The opposition alleged that the elections of 1867 had been fraudulent, and Juarez was suspected of harboring unconstitutional ideas. This suspicion was increased when his ministers asked congress several times and particularly on the 25th of January, 1868 to grant him stronger powers, which was done on May 8, 1868.

He further provoked opposition, when he decided to run for office again in 1871. Juarez had great prestige and substantial support, but liberal critics believed that successive reelections were against the spirit of democracy. The other prominent candidates were Sebastian Lerdo de Tejada and Porfirio Diaz. None of the candidates achieved a majority and the selection of the winner then fell upon congress which on October 12, 1871, chose Juarez who was inaugurated on December 1 amidst accusations of electoral fraud.

Plan de la Noria

Among the opposition to Juarez were found certain congressmen who petitioned Porfirio Diaz to take up arms against the government. On November 8, 1871, he issued from the town of La Noria a manifesto proclaiming loyalty to the constitution of 1857 and electoral freedom, and called forth a plan for reconstituting the nation.

The rebels gained support throughout the country, but suffered a significant defeat at Cerro de la Bufa in Zacatecas. Diaz approached Mexico City with a column of cavalry but then turned towards Jalisco when support from within Mexico City was found to be unreliable.

In the early part of June, 1872 while fighting was still ongoing Juarez suffered a ministerial crisis. Matias Romero and Castillo Velasco resigned, and Juarez had to shuffle his cabinet, with Joaquín Ruiz refusing the offer to serve as Minister of Justice and Public instruction.

President Juarez began to experience heart problems in July, 1872 and he died on the 18th, before the Plan of La Noria had been entirely suppressed. The presidency passed to Sebastian Lerdo de Tejada who as President of the Supreme Court was next in the line of succession.

Lerdo presidency

Lerdo retained Juarez’ ministers, and proposed an amnesty to the Noria rebels. Most of the insurgents accepted.

Porfirio Diaz however rejected the amnesty and on August 1 sent his response to the president, threatening future insurrection in case the government did not reform, and urging the government to pass measures to protect the integrity of elections. President Lerdo was unyielding and made it clear that he would not negotiate with Diaz. By the end of September most of the revolutionary forces had accepted the amnesty. The revolution increasingly dissipated as its entire motive, the removal of Juarez, had been rendered irrelevant by his death. On October 26, Diaz finally unconditionally accepted President Lerdo's amnesty.

In 1873, the Lerdo government had to deal with an insurrection led by the indigenous leader, Manuel Lozada in Tepic in the western part of the country. He was captured and executed in August.

The question of finances, railroad development, and internal security continued to occupy congress and the presidency. Murder and kidnapping was so rampant that on May 2, 1873, President Lerdo brought the matter before congress which subsequently proclaimed martial law against bandits, even allowing summary executions for such individuals caught in the act, with suspected bandits to be tried, and if found guilty to be executed within fifteen days with no possibility of appeals.

The Lerdo presidency continued to enforce and add to the anti-clerical reform laws first passed in the 1850s. Two hundred nuns in Mexico City were expelled from their communities, and certain Jesuits and nuns were banished from the country. The establishment of monastic orders was late completely outlawed and this measure was incorporated into the constitution. Protestants and Mormons were also at this being allowed to settle in the nation and establish missions.

From 1874 to 1876 the government faced no major military coups, although a few local disturbances did flare up. Violence was nonetheless rampant throughout the nation, the aforementioned law against bandits being extended, and a decree of 1875 stripping them of all citizen's rights within the court system.

Amidst increasing opposition to his rule, such as from prominent liberal general Vicente Riva Palacio who accused the president of violating the constitution, Lerdo decided to run for reelection in 1876.

Plan of Tuxtepec
On January 15, 1876, General Fidencio Hernandez in Oaxaca issued a pronuniciamiento against Lerdo in the town of Tuxtepec. He marched against Oaxaca City with two thousand poorly armed indigenous troops and the garrison there joined him without firing a shot. The revolutionary army then declared Porfirio Diaz to be their leader.

By March, the insurgency had spread throughout the entire country, and government forces began to clash with the rebels. Mariano Escobedo succeeded in pacifying Michoacan, while the loyalist General Alatorre was repulsed at Oaxaca.

General Diaz meanwhile had crossed over to the United States from which he published a reformed version of the Plan of Tuxtepec. He condemned Lerdo for interfering with elections and with the affairs of state governments.

In November, 1876, president of the supreme court José María Iglesias condemned the presidential elections that had just occurred as fraudulent, and from the town of Salamanca, Guanajuato, called upon the nation to overthrow Lerdo. Iglesias now, claiming to be president headed to Guanajuato with two of his chosen ministers, Guillermo Prieto and Felipe Berriozábal, where they were received with great enthusiasm.

Lerdo now had to deal with two independent insurrections against him. On November 15, government forces under the command of Alatorre suffered an egregious defeat at Huamantla. Lerdo was forced to flee the capital after handing it over to the Porfirista general Francisco Loaeza. He thereafter fled the country for the United States and took up residence in New York City.

Triumph of Porfirio Diaz

The country was now divided between supporters of Iglesias and supporters of Diaz. After months of uncertainty, troop movements, and negotiations, Iglesias conceded the presidency to Diaz by the end of 1876.

Diaz entered the capital and assumed the presidency on February 15, 1877. Diaz released a manifesto emphasizing the liberal progressive character of his movement and inviting men of all factions to cooperate within his government, in contrast to Lerdo, who had kept the same clique of Juaristas throughout his presidency. New elections were held for the presidency and Diaz was the victor, his term scheduled to expire on November 30, 1880.

In spite of revolting against Lerdo, in part to oppose his reelection, Diaz himself, with one exception in 1880, would proceed to be reelected repeatedly until his reign became a de facto dictatorship which would not end until the Mexican Revolution in 1911. His reign was an autocratic one, yet it would also be one of unprecedented national peace and economic development. It would come to be known as the Porfiriato.

References

Further reading
Chassen-López, Francie, From Liberal to Revolutionary Oaxaca: The View from the South, Mexico 1867-1911. University Park: Penn State University Press 2004.
Coatsworth, John H. "Obstacles to economic growth in nineteenth-century Mexico." The American Historical Review 83.1 (1978): 80–100.
Cosío Villegas, Daniel. Historia Moderna de México, La Republica Retaurada: La Vida Política. Mexico City: Hermes 1955.
Falcone, Frank Samuel. "Federal-state relations during Mexico's restored republic: Oaxaca, a case study, 1867-1872." (1973).
García Granados, Ricardo. Historia de México Desde La Restauración de la República en 1867 Hasta la Caída de Huerta. 1. Ed. Completa.. ed. México: Editorial Jus, 1956.
Hale, Charles A. The transformation of liberalism in late nineteenth-century Mexico. Princeton University Press, 2014.
Hamnett, Brian R. "Liberalism Divided: Regional Polities and the National Project During the Mexican Restored Republic, 1867–1876." Hispanic American Historical Review 76.4 (1996): 659–689.
Katz, Friedrich. "Mexico: Restored Republic and Porfiriato." The Cambridge History of Latin America (New York: Cambridge University Press, 1986) 5: 16–20.
Knapp, Frank Averill, Jr. The Life of Sebastián Lerdo de Tejada: A Study in Influence and Obscurity. Austin: University of Texas Press 1951.
McNamara, Patrick J. Sons of the Sierra: Juárez, Díaz, and the people of Ixtlán, Oaxaca, 1855-1920. Chapel Hill: University of North Carolina Press, 2007.
Perry, Laurens Ballard. Juárez and Díaz: Machine Politics in Mexico.  DeKalb: Northern Illinois University Press 1978. 
Perry, Laurens Ballard. "El modelo liberal y la política práctica en la República restaurada 1867-1876." Historia mexicana 23.4 (1974): 646-699
Powell, T.G. El liberalism y el campesinado en el centro de México, 1850 a 1876. Mexico City: SepSetentas 1974.
Riva Palacio, Vicente. Historia de la administración de don Sebastián Lerdo de Tejada. Mexico: El Padre Cobos 1875.
 

History of Mexico
Independent Mexico